Fort Lincoln is a neighborhood located in northeastern Washington, D.C. It is bounded by Bladensburg Road to the northwest, Eastern Avenue to the northeast, New York Avenue NE to the south, and South Dakota Avenue NE to the southwest.  The town of Colmar Manor, Maryland, is across Eastern Avenue from the Fort Lincoln neighborhood, as is the Fort Lincoln Cemetery.

The name Fort Lincoln was originally used for a Civil War Fort in adjacent Prince George's County, Maryland, across the D.C. line from the Washington neighborhood bearing its name.

Neighborhood

This northeast Washington neighborhood is home to the Fort Lincoln "New Town" development constructed in the 1960s and 1970s.  This neighborhood is currently the home of Cathy Lanier, former Chief of the D.C. Metropolitan Police.  In 2011 another 42 acres of the wetland forest park was sold to make a shopping center.

War of 1812 battlefield site

References

External links

"Fort Lincoln: Finding a Leafy Enclave," By Linda Wheeler, The Washington Post, July 18, 1992
 Fort Lincoln Historical Marker, The Maryland Historical Marker Database

Neighborhoods in Northeast (Washington, D.C.)